Abdul Rauf is a Pakistani Deobandi fundamentalist Islamist militant commander of the Jaish-e-Mohammed (JeM), a Deobandi Islamist militant organization which has carried out Islamist militant activities in India & Afghanistan under the support of Pakistan's main intelligence agency.

Involvement in hijacking of Indian Airlines
The Abdul Rauf Azhar is involved in the hijacking of an Indian Airlines Flight 814 under the support of Pakistan's main intelligence agency and Taliban to secure the release of 36 Islamist jihadists held in prison in India – fellow Harkat-ul-Mujahideen members specially for his older brother Masood Azhar including two jihadists like Ahmed Omar Saeed and Mushtaq Ahmed. The hostage crisis lasted for seven days and ended after India agreed to release the three jihadists out of 36 jihadists, In 2000 the jihadists formed a new outfit named as, Jaish-e-Mohammed and have since been implicated in other militant actions, such as the 2001 Indian Parliament attack, 2002 kidnapping and murder of Daniel Pearl, 2008 Mumbai terror attacks, 2016 Pathankot attack and the 2019 Pulwama attack. The Abdul Rauf Azhar is one of the most wanted persons in India due to their history of activities against India.

Command of Jaish-e-Mohammed
Abdul Rauf Azhar took command of the Jaish-e-Mohammed on 21 April 2007, when his older brother, Maulana Masood Azhar its former leader, went underground under the support of Pakistan's main intelligence agency.

Activities in Islamabad
In 2009 the BBC News reported Rauf was one of the leaders summoned to Islamabad to help the Pakistani government negotiate with hostage-takers who had seized 42 civilians.

Designation as a terrorist
On 2 December 2010, the United States Treasury designated Abdul Rauf Azhar as a terrorist.

Links with other militant organisations
JeM commander Azhar maintains strong ties with the Taliban and Al-Qaeda, Lashkar-e-Taiba, Haqqani network sharing their training camps in Afghanistan, and exchanging intelligence, training and coordination.

Links with political organisations
JeM commander Azhar had strong ties with these Islamist political organisations Milli Muslim League,Jamiat Ulema-e-Islam (S),Allah-o-Akbar Tehreek,Sipah-e-Sahaba and also had ties with Difa-e-Pakistan Council the anti-NATO Pakistani umbrella coalition including links with ISI-sponsored United Jihad Council, an umbrella organisation of 13–16 separatist organisations that fight in Indian-administered Kashmir.

See also
Mushtaq Ahmed Zargar
Ahmed Omar Sheikh
Ilyas Kashmiri
Osama bin laden
Zakir Rashid Bhat

References

Pakistani Islamic religious leaders
Deobandis
Pakistani Sunni Muslim scholars of Islam
People from Bahawalpur
1977 births
Living people
Leaders of Islamic terror groups
Pakistani Islamists